Ape Escape is a platform video game, developed by Japan Studio and published by Sony Computer Entertainment. It was released for the PlayStation in May 1999 in North America, and June 1999 in Japan. The first in the Ape Escape series, the game tells the story of an ape named Specter who gains enhanced intelligence and a malevolent streak through the use of an experimental helmet. Specter produces an army of apes, which he sends through time in an attempt to rewrite history. Spike, the player character, sets out to capture the apes with the aid of special gadgets.

Ape Escape is played from a third-person perspective. Players use a variety of gadgets to pursue and capture the apes, traversing across several environments. The game's controls are heavily centred around the analog sticks, being the first game to require the use of the PlayStation's DualShock. Development of Ape Escape lasted over two years, and was generally focused on adapting to the use of the controller, which was a significant challenge for the development team.

Ape Escape was met with critical acclaim from critics, with praise particularly directed at the innovative use of the dual analog controls, as well as the graphics and music; the voice acting received minor criticism. The game is widely considered to be one of the greatest on the PlayStation console, and received several re-releases. The game also spawned numerous sequels and spin-offs, beginning with Ape Escape 2 in 2002. A remake, Ape Escape: On the Loose, was released for the PlayStation Portable in 2005 to mixed reviews.

Gameplay

Ape Escape is a platform game that is viewed from a third-person perspective. Players traverse several different environments to advance through the game. For most of the game, players control Spike—a boy tasked with pursuing and capturing the apes across time, preventing them from rewriting history. Players use various gadgets to pursue and capture the apes, such as the Stun Club, used as an offensive measure against enemies, and the Time Net, used to capture apes and transport them to present day. More gadgets become available as players progress through the game. Players also control vehicles throughout the game, including a rubber raft, which allows travel over water, and the water net, which assists in traversing underwater. The game's controls are heavily centered around the analog sticks: the left stick is used to move players, while the right stick manipulates the various gadgets.

The apes are equipped with helmets, which feature a siren representing their alarm level: blue means relaxed, and unaware of the player characters' presence; yellow is alert; and red indicates fully alarmed, resulting in attempting to escape or becoming hostile. An ape's personality can also be determined by the colour of shorts: yellow is standard, light blue means timid, and red represents aggressive. Some apes are equipped with weaponry, allowing them to attack players, or binoculars that allow them to identify players from long distances. Players are required to capture a specific number of apes to clear a level; remaining apes can be captured upon revisiting the level.

Should players take damage, they lose a life. Players can recharge their health by collecting cookies. Throughout the game, players can gather Specter Coins, which can be found in hidden locations in each stage. Collecting enough Specter Coins unlocks three bonus mini-games: Ski Kidz Racing, a skiing game in which players race against opponents; Galaxy Monkey, a shoot 'em up where players fight against aliens; and Specter Boxing, a boxing game where players dodge and punch using the analog sticks.

Plot

The story begins when Specter, a white-haired monkey who is well known at his home in a monkey-themed amusement park, puts on a Monkey/Peak Point Helmet created by a Professor, which increases his intelligence beyond that of a regular monkey but, due to it being a prototype version, also twists his mind, turning him evil. Imbued with this new power, Specter gives Monkey Helmets to all the monkeys in the park and sets them loose, having them take over the local laboratory where the Professor and his assistant Natalie (Katie/Natsumi) are currently building a time machine. As Spike (Kakeru) and his best friend Jake (Buzz/Hiroki) arrive at the laboratory, they find themselves transported by Specter, along with all the other monkeys, to the various reaches of time. Realizing that leaving the monkeys to their own devices could rewrite history in disastrous ways, the Professor tasks Spike with finding all of the monkeys scattered across time and sending them back to the present.

Spike must also face off against Specter, who has not only built himself an advanced Monkey Helmet further increasing his own intelligence but has also brainwashed Jake to his side. After a lengthy series of captures and battles in segments of history ranging from the age of the dinosaurs, medieval times, and the present day, Spike is eventually able to capture all of the apes. Spike chases Specter to his deranged theme park, where he is holding a recently captured Professor, Natalie, and his friend Jake. Spike frees Jake of his mind control, and releases both the professor and Natalie, and goes on to find Specter in an alternative universe he calls the "Peak Point Matrix". Spike defeats Specter after a final battle, and he is captured and sent back to the zoo.

Development

The development of Ape Escape lasted approximately two-and-a-half years. Shortly after the development team began conceiving the design and concept for Ape Escape, they attended a meeting regarding the development of the DualShock. Intrigued by the potential of the controller, the team implemented its use in Ape Escape, making it the first video game to require the use of the DualShock for gameplay. Conceptualizing the controls for the controller's analog sticks was the greatest challenge for the team, and the controls underwent great testing prior to finalization.

The game's music was composed by Soichi Terada. After a game director listened to Terada's track "Sumo Jungle", he was given the opportunity to compose the music for Ape Escape. The music changes in-game depending on the situation and level; for example, should players act stealthily, the music alters slightly to give a mellow atmosphere. Music from the game was included in Ape Escape Originape Soundtracks, published on November 18, 2011, by Terada's label Far East Recording. The gameplay sound effects were designed by Masaaki Kaneko, while the sound effects in the cutscenes were provided by Masatoshi Mizumachi. The English voice acting was recorded at Dubey Tunes Studios in San Francisco, California, with Sara Holihan and Hunter A. Pipes III serving as voice-over director and producer, respectively.

Ape Escape was officially announced in the April 1999 issue of Official U.S. PlayStation Magazine. A playable demonstration was integrated into the Jampack Summer '99 compilation CD released by PlayStation Underground. A second playable demonstration was included on a promotional compilation disc released by Pizza Hut on November 14. Promotions for the game were held on Cartoon Network during Sony's winter holiday marketing campaign of 1999. A remake of the game, titled Ape Escape: On the Loose, was announced on May 11, 2004, during Sony's press conference at the Electronic Entertainment Expo. It was released as a launch title for the PlayStation Portable (PSP) on March 24, 2005. The remake features altered controls, due to the lack of a right analog stick on the PSP, as well as some slightly different graphics and mini-games.

Reception

Critical reception 

Ape Escape received critical acclaim. Metacritic calculated an average score of 90 out of 100, indicating "universal acclaim", based on 19 reviews. Japanese publication Famitsu awarded the game 32 out of 40, based on four reviews. Reviewers praised the game's use of analog controls, as well as its graphics and music, with minor criticism directed towards the voice acting.

Reviewers praised the gameplay, and the game's use of analog controls. Johnny Liu of Game Revolution wrote that the innovative controls were one of the game's standout features. GameSpots Peter Bartholow declared the controls "beautifully executed", praising the ease of use. Doug Perry of IGN felt that, while the controls are initially difficult, using the analog sticks became "new and refreshing". Scott Alan Marriott of AllGame similarly noted the initial difficulty of the controls, but found it easier upon continued play, particularly praising the raft controls. Edge credited the game's distinct stages and original weapons, concluding that Ape Escape "offers enough novelty to make it worth serious consideration for anyone tired of the many me-too platformers". Next Generation felt that the game's "general light-hearted cuteness makes it ideal for younger players, but its originality and challenge will also appeal to the most jaded hardcore players".

The graphics were met with generally positive comments. GameSpots Bartholow praised the visuals, naming the game "a sight to behold" and commending the use of colour and detail. IGNs Perry wrote that the textures "aren't terribly stunning", and found the character design "rather fundamental", but felt that the game's lighting and camera blended to create "a fantastic and gratifying effect". Game Revolutions Liu named the graphics "good, but not the best", noting frame rate slowdown. Marriott of AllGame similarly mentioned pop-up issues and other glitches, but ultimately commended the graphics, noting the "distinct Japanese style".

The game's audio was commended by many reviews. AllGames Marriott praised the appropriateness of the music to the game's setting. GameSpots Bartholow echoed similar remarks, applauding the interactivity of the soundtrack. Liu of Game Revolution felt that the music improves as the game progresses, similarly commending its use with gameplay. IGNs Perry described the soundtrack as "a weird concoction of J-pop and techno-synth", and noted that the "poppy tunes" were catchier than the "techno tunes". Conversely, particular criticism was directed at the voice acting in the game; GameSpots Bartholow described it as "uniformly atrocious", while IGNs Perry referred to Spike's voice as "nothing special". The game's other sound effects, such as the ape noises, were met with positive reactions.

PlayStation Portable version

Ape Escape: On the Loose, the game's remake for PlayStation Portable, was met with mixed reviews. Metacritic calculated a score of 66 out of 100, indicating "mixed or average reviews", based on 35 critics. Jeff Gerstmann of GameSpot lamented the loss of the "finely tuned control" of the original, but felt that the game "still has considerable charm". GameSpys David Chapman felt that, despite the noticeable flaws of the game, particularly the controls, it still remains "a lot of fun to play". Juan Castro of IGN praised the game's use of colour, noting its enhancement on the PlayStation Portable screen. Castro also warned that "fans of the series will probably miss the second analog stick", but felt that the gadgets mapped to the PSP's face buttons would suffice. 1UPs Jeremy Parish criticised the porting of the game for being outdated, declaring it "a game that was better in another time, on another system, ported simply for cynical convenience". Parish felt that On the Loose served "to blemish the PSP's reputation ... as a dumping ground for warmed over 32-bit offerings far beyond their sell-by date".

Legacy 
Ape Escape is considered one of the most significant titles on the PlayStation console. Doug Perry of IGN declared it "the best 3D platform game on the PlayStation", and GameSpot's Peter Bartholow named it "one of the best 3D platformers to date". Scott Alan Marriott of AllGame described the game as "one of the most enjoyable 3D platform games" on the PlayStation. IGN included Ape Escape in an article documenting the greatest PlayStation 3D platform games, and later named it the eighth greatest game on the console. In March 2004, Official UK PlayStation Magazine named it the ninth greatest game of all time. Game Informer ranked it 100 on its list of best games in 2001, praising its gameplay and innovation.

Ape Escape spawned a series of games, including sequels and spin-offs. A direct sequel, Ape Escape 2, was released for the PlayStation 2 (PS2) in July 2001, followed by Ape Escape 3 for PS2 in July 2005. Several spin-off titles were released exclusively in Japan: Pipo Saru 2001 in July 2001 and Saru! Get You! Million Monkeys in July 2006 for the PS2, followed by Saru Get You: Pip Saru Racer in December 2006 and Saru! Get You! SaruSaru Big Mission in July 2007 for the PSP. Another spin-off, Ape Quest, was also released worldwide for PSP in January 2008. A series of party games has also been released: Ape Escape: Pumped & Primed in July 2004 and EyeToy: Monkey Mania in August 2004 for PS2, as well as Ape Academy 2 for PSP in December 2005, and PlayStation Move Ape Escape for the PlayStation 3 in December 2010. The character of Spike is available as a playable character in PlayStation All-Stars Battle Royale (2012), and an ape costume is available as a downloadable outfit in some of the LittleBigPlanet games (2008–12). A mini-game featuring an ape from Ape Escape is included in Metal Gear Solid 3: Snake Eater (2004).

Ape Escape was added to the Deluxe tier of the PlayStation Plus lineup in May 2022, playable on PlayStation 4 and PlayStation 5 with full Trophy support.

Notes

References 

Sources

1999 video games
3D platform games
Ape Escape games
Dinosaurs in video games
PlayStation (console) games
PlayStation Portable games
Single-player video games
Sony Interactive Entertainment games
Video games about time travel
Video games developed in Japan
Video games scored by Soichi Terada
Video games set in China
Video games set in Japan
Video games set in Oceania
Video games set in the Middle Ages
Video games set in prehistory